Abmisha is a genus of crickets in tribe Gryllini; species are recorded from East Africa.

Taxonomy
The Orthoptera Species File database lists the following species:
Abmisha coiblemmoides Gorochov, 2001 
Abmisha illex Otte, 1987 - type species (locality Shimba Hills, Kenya)
Abmisha sigi Otte, 1987

References

Gryllinae
Orthoptera genera
Taxa named by Dan Otte